Memoirs of a Madman is a CD/DVD compilation album by heavy metal vocalist Ozzy Osbourne, released by Epic Records and Legacy Recordings on 14 October 2014.

Track listing

CD

DVD 1

DVD 2

Personnel
Tracks 1-4
Ozzy Osbourne - vocals
Randy Rhoads - guitar
Bob Daisley - bass
Lee Kerslake - drums
Don Airey - keyboards (only on tracks 1 and 2)

Track 5
Ozzy Osbourne - vocals
Jake E. Lee - guitar
Bob Daisley - bass
Tommy Aldridge - drums
Don Airey - keyboards

Track 6
Ozzy Osbourne - vocals
Jake E. Lee - guitar
Phil Soussan - bass
Randy Castillo - drums
Mike Moran - keyboards

Tracks 7-10
Ozzy Osbourne - vocals
Zakk Wylde - guitar
Bob Daisley - bass
Randy Castillo - drums
John Sinclair - keyboards

Tracks 11 and 12
Ozzy Osbourne - vocals
Zakk Wylde - guitar
Geezer Butler - bass
Deen Castronovo - drums
Rick Wakeman - keyboards

Tracks 13 and 14
Ozzy Osbourne - vocals
Zakk Wylde - guitar
Robert Trujillo - bass
Mike Bordin - drums
Tim Palmer - keyboards

Track 15
Ozzy Osbourne - vocals
Zakk Wylde - guitar
Rob "Blasko" Nicholson - bass
Mike Bordin - drums

Tracks 16 and 17
Ozzy Osbourne - vocals
Gus G - guitar
Rob "Blasko" Nicholson - bass
Tommy Clufetos - drums
Adam Wakeman - keyboards

Charts

References

Ozzy Osbourne compilation albums
Epic Records compilation albums
2014 greatest hits albums